Ärentuna SK is a Swedish football club located in Uppsala.

Background
Ärentuna SK currently plays in Division 4 Uppland which is the sixth tier of  Swedish football. They play their home matches at the Ärentuna IP in Uppsala.

The club is affiliated to Upplands Fotbollförbund.

Footnotes

External links
 Ärentuna SK – Official website

Football clubs in Uppsala County